The seventh season of the American legal drama Suits was ordered on August 3, 2016, and started airing on USA Network in the United States July 12, 2017. The season has five series regulars playing employees at the fictional Pearson Specter Litt law firm in Manhattan: Gabriel Macht, Patrick J. Adams, Rick Hoffman, Meghan Markle, and Sarah Rafferty. Gina Torres is credited as the sixth regular only for the episodes that she appears in, following her departure last season.

The season featured the 100th episode of the series, which was directed by Patrick J. Adams and aired August 30, 2017. To celebrate the series' milestone, the main cast (including Gina Torres) and creator Aaron Korsh came together at ATX Television Festival for a live read-through of the series' pilot script. They were joined by Abigail Spencer and Nick Wechsler to read for the episode's guest stars.

After Markle's engagement to Prince Harry was announced on November 27, 2017, it was confirmed by show producers the next day that she would be leaving the show at the end of the season. The back half of the season aired from March 28, 2018, to April 25, 2018, concluding the season with a finale that saw the departure of both Markle and Adams.

Cast

Regular cast
 Gabriel Macht as Harvey Specter
 Patrick J. Adams as Mike Ross
 Rick Hoffman as Louis Litt
 Meghan Markle as Rachel Zane
 Sarah Rafferty as Donna Paulsen
 Gina Torres as Jessica Pearson

Special Guest Cast
 Dulé Hill as Alex Williams

Recurring cast
 Christina Cole as Dr. Paula Agard
 Aloma Wright as Gretchen Bodinski
 Jordan Johnson-Hinds as Oliver Grady
 Peter Cambor as Nathan
 Wendell Pierce as Robert Zane
 Jake Epstein as Brian Altman
 Paul Schulze as Frank Gallo
 Ray Proscia as Dr. Stan Lipschitz
 Al Sapienza as Thomas Bratton
 Jay Harrington as Mark Meadows
 Zoe McLellan as Holly Cromwell
 Rachael Harris as Sheila Sazs
 Amanda Schull as Katrina Bennett
 John Kapelos as Elias Gould
 Bruce McGill as Stanley Gordon
 Nitya Vidyasagar as Stephanie Patel

Guest Cast
 Megan Gallagher as Laura Zane
 Abigail Spencer as Dana Scott
 D.B. Woodside as Jeff Malone
 John Pyper-Ferguson as Jack Soloff
 Leslie Hope as Anita Gibbs
 Brynn Thayer as Lily Specter

Notes

Episodes

Ratings

References

External links 
 
 

07
2017 American television seasons
2018 American television seasons